Route 209 is a provincial highway located in the Montérégie region of Quebec south of Montreal. The route runs from the Canada-United States border in Franklin and ends at the Saint-Constant/Sainte-Catherine limit, south of Montreal at the junction of Route 132. South of the US border it continues as New York State Route 189 in Clinton, New York. This road serves as an alternative route to Route 138 (towards Montreal) and the southwestern suburbs) which is a parallel route to Route 209 located roughly 10 kilometers west of it. It also provides the main link to Saint-Rémi, the largest city in the Jardins-de-Napierville MRC.

Municipalities along Route 209
 Franklin
 Saint-Chrysostome
 Sainte-Clotilde
 Saint-Rémi
 Saint-Constant
 Saint-Catherine

Major intersections

See also
 List of Quebec provincial highways

References

External links  
 Official Transport Quebec Road Map
 Route 209 at Google Maps

209